Joan Roughgarden (born Jonathan David Roughgarden, 13 March 1946) is an American ecologist and  evolutionary biologist. She has engaged in theory and observation of coevolution and competition in Anolis lizards of the Caribbean, and recruitment limitation in the rocky intertidal zones of California and Oregon. She has more recently become known for her rejection of sexual selection and her theistic evolutionism.

Personal life and education

Roughgarden was born in Paterson, New Jersey, United States. She received a Bachelor of Science in biology (with Distinction and Phi Beta Kappa) and a Bachelor of Arts in Philosophy with highest honors from University of Rochester in 1968 and later a Ph.D. in biology from Harvard University in 1971. In 1998, Roughgarden came out as transgender and changed her name to Joan, making a coming out post on her website on her 52nd birthday.

Career

Roughgarden worked as an instructor and Assistant Professor of Biology at the University of Massachusetts Boston from 1970 to 1972. In 1972 she joined the faculty of the Department of Biology at Stanford University. After becoming full professor she retired in 2011, and became Emeritus Professor. She founded and directed the Earth Systems Program at Stanford and has received awards for service to undergraduate education. In 2012 she moved to Hawaii, where she became an adjunct professor at the Hawaiʻi Institute of Marine Biology. In her academic career, Roughgarden advised 20 Ph.D. students and 15 postdoctoral fellows.

Roughgarden has authored books and over 180 scientific articles. In addition to a textbook on ecological and evolutionary theory in 1979, Roughgarden has carried out ecological field studies with Caribbean lizards and with barnacles and their larvae along the California coast. In 2015, she wrote the fiction novel Ram-2050, a science-fiction retelling of the Ramayana.

Research

Caribbean Anoles & Interspecific Competition 
Roughgarden's early work in the 1970s and 80s helped to develop the Anolis lizards of the Caribbean as an important model system for evolution and ecology. For example, she used she two-species enclosure experiments on two Caribbean islands to demonstrate increasing strength of interspecific competition as resource partitioning decreases: a central tenet for competition theory. The Anolis system thus provided an early example of an eco-evolutionary feedback, and with further development by Jonathan Losos and others, has become an important example of adaptive radiation.

Barnacles & Recruitment Limitation 
After setting up a lab at the Hopkins Marine Station, Roughgarden sought to extend her approach of combining theoretical with field research by studying intertidal acorn barnacles (Balanus and Chthamalus spp). Earlier work by Joseph Connell, Bob Paine and others had suggested that the characteristic zonation of rocky intertidal communities was predominantly structured by predation, (for example by Pisaster seastars) and by competition, wherein dominant Balanus species displaced Chthamalus species to the high intertidal zones. Together with her student, Steve Gaines, Roughgarden showed that these interspecific interactions were most important in intertidal localities and communities with a high density of barnacles, such as those Connell and others had studied in Scotland. At Hopkins in Central California, however, barnacle density was lower, and the amount of free space was best explained by periodic pulses of larval recruitment.  With her student Sean Connolly, she then showed, through both empirical observation and modeling, that a latitudinal gradient in upwelling along the west coast of North America created very dense barnacle recruitment in the north (Oregon and Washington), where upwelling was weak, and very sparse barnacle recruitment in the south (California), where upwelling was strong. This in turn explained why field studies in the north had found interspecific interactions to be important, while her own field studies in the south had found larval recruitment to be most important for structuring intertidal populations. This deft synthesis helped to drive a paradigm shift in marine ecology which emphasized larval dispersal and recruitment dynamics over adult interactions and favored demographic models of populations open to larval recruits from distant localities, which dominated the field during the 1990s.

Criticism of sexual selection 

Around the time of her transition, Roughgarden began to shift her research focus to Darwin’s theory of sexual selection. In her 2004 book, Evolution’s Rainbow, Roughgarden analyzes how biology can influence human sexuality and gender identity and explores the substantial diversity of mating systems and sexuality throughout the animal kingdom, with an eye toward understanding human sexual categories like gay, lesbian, and trans. In this book, and other articles around the same time, she offered criticism of sexual selection theory by providing examples of species that depart from its predictions (such as homosexual behavior in bonobos, elephants and lizards) as well as highlighting contradictions between population genetic theory and sexual selection theory. She also provided the beginnings of an alternative theory to sexual selection called social selection, which she describes as being focused on natural selection based on differential offspring production, where sexual selection is focused on differential mating success.

A 2006 article in the journal Science with her student Erol Akçay, and Meeko Oishi, formally presented the theory of social selection in terms of game theory. Beyond the Nash Competitive Equilibrium (NCE) imported to evolutionary biology by John Maynard Smith as the Evolutionary Stable Strategy, Roughgarden et al. discuss the Nash Bargaining Solution(NBS), which exists as an alternative to the NCE that is reached through negotiation. When playing in developmental time (as opposed to evolutionary time), a game player that stands to lose individual fitness at an NCE relative to its competitor may establish a threat point by promising to play a sub-optimal strategy. Through negotiation, for example via a side payment, the players can arrive at an NBS through playing mixed strategies across repeated games which thereby maximizes the fitness of the cooperative “team” (which consists of both players) rather than to any one player. Roughgarden et al. provide several examples of what such cooperative game play would look like in nature, and then define the evolutionary theory of social selection as one which considers such cooperative team games in the developmental tier as the primitive state, with sexual conflict as the derived state. They argue that social selection theory is mutually exclusive with the evolutionary theory of sexual selection, which treats sexual conflict as the primitive state and sexual cooperation as derived.

Following the Science paper, forty scientists produced ten critical letters stating that the article was misleading, that it contained misunderstandings and misrepresentations, that sexual selection accounted for all the data presented and subsumed Roughgarden's theoretical analysis, and that sexual selection explained data that her theory could not. Troy Day stated that "many people felt that this was completely shoddy science and poor scholarship, all motivated by a personal agenda". Roughgarden stated she was "not altogether surprised" by the volume of dissent and that her theory was not an extension of sexual selection theory.

Tim Clutton-Brock of Oxford University wrote a more detailed rebuttal in Science in 2007, in which he concedes the point that males can engage in sexual selection on females, even in species where the operational sex ratio is biased towards males, stating: “Consequently, satisfactory explanations of the evolution of sex differences requires an understanding of the operation of sexual slection in females as well as males”. Nevertheless, Clutton-Brock concludes that sexual selection is a robust theoretical framework, without ever addressing the theoretical distinction in the polarity of intersexual cooperation and conflict highlighted by Roughgarden et al.

In her 2009 book The Genial Gene, Roughgarden continues to build a case against sexual selection theory and to present social selection theory as an alternative. The book is titled as a response to the popular book, The Selfish Gene, by Richard Dawkins, which expounds what Roughgarden describes a “neo-Spencerian” view of nature “red in tooth and claw” in which competition and conflict dominate. In The Genial Gene, after an initial section defining and attacking sexual selection, followed by a definition of social selection as one based on differences in offspring-production, rather than differences in mating success.

A second section is focused on the genetic basis of social selection. The first chapter addresses how sexual reproduction evolved in the first place, and makes the case for Roughgarden’s Portfolio hypothesis, which emphasizes that sexual reproduction creates genetic diversity through recombination, as opposed to the more commonly favored Muller’s Ratchet, which emphasizes that sex removes deleterious mutations through recombination. The second chapter explains the binary distribution of gamete types (sperm vs. egg) as a strategy to maximize gametic contact, rather than as a result of conflicting gametic strategies. A final chapter argues that hermaphroditism, rather than gonochorism, is the primitive state of sexuality.

The third section takes a two-tier approach to developing social selection theory. A behavioral tier focuses on game theory and Nash Bargaining Solutions as outlined in her 2006 paper. A second population genetic tier is then described that operates as a result of many replays of the behavioral tier.  The book concludes by listing 26 phenomena that, according to Roughgarden, are explained differently by sexual selection theory and are better explained by social selection theory. She says that sexual selection theory derives from a view of natural behavior predicated on the selfish-gene concept, competition and deception, whereas the social-selection theory derives from teamwork, honesty, and genetic equality. As of 2012 she has continued to study if social selection as opposed to sexual selection is a more important driver of evolution for colonial species such as corals or perhaps humans.

Roughgarden's criticism of sexual selection has been rejected by the scientific community, and her papers on it have received few citations in scientific literature. In a 2019 interview, she stated that "Most biologists remain defensive of sexual selection theory”.

In 2013, Roughgarden funded a Catalysis meeting at the National Evolutionary Synthesis Center with the goal of debating and reviewing "the status of sexual selection studies and to indicate challenges and future directions". The group struggled to come to a consensus definition of sexual selection, but a subgroup offered a definition that for the first time explicitly differentiated fecundity selection for sexual selection sensu strictu.

Theistic evolution

Roughgarden has written on the relationship between Christianity and science. Her book Evolution and Christian Faith: Reflections of an Evolutionary Biologist presents scripture passages that emphasize her belief that the Bible does not conflict with evolutionary biology and relates Christianity and evolution by asserting that all life is interconnected, as members of a faith community are connected. Roughgarden opposes  creationism and intelligent design, but asserts her belief in God's involvement in evolution. She was a speaker at the Beyond Belief symposium in 2006.

Awards and honors 
Stonewall Book Award, 2005
Center Fellow, National Center for Ecological Synthesis and Analysis, University of California (Santa Barbara), 1998
Dinkelspiel Award for Undergraduate Teaching, Stanford University, in 1995
Visiting Research Fellow at the Merton College, University of Oxford, in 1994
Elected Fellow of the American Academy of Arts and Sciences in 1993
Fellow of Guggenheim Foundation in 1985
University Fellow, Stanford University in 1978

Roughgarden has served as associate editor of several academic journals, including Philosophy and Theory in Biology (since 2008), American Naturalist (1984–1989), Oecologia (1979–1982), and Theoretical Population Biology (1975–1986). She was the vice-chair and Chair of Theoretical Ecology Section of the Ecological Society of America during 2002–2003. She has served on the Nonprofit Organization Board for the Oceanic Society (San Francisco), the EPA Science Advisory Board Committee on Valuating the Protection of Ecological Systems and Services, and the science advisory boards of the Pacific Ocean Conservation Network (California), and the Channel Islands National Marine Sanctuary (Santa Barbara).

Selected bibliography 
 
 Roughgarden, J. The Genial Gene: Deconstructing Darwinian Selfishness. Hardcover ed. University of California Press, 2009 
 Roughgarden, J. Evolution and Christian Faith: Reflections of an Evolutionary Biologist. Hardcover ed. Washington, D.C.: Island Press, 2006. 
 Roughgarden, J. Evolution's Rainbow: Diversity, Gender and Sexuality in Nature and People. Berkeley CA: Univ. of California Press, 2004. 
 Roughgarden, J. Primer of Ecological Theory. 1st ed. Prentice Hall, 1997.
 Roughgarden, J. Anolis Lizards of the Caribbean: Ecology, Evolution and Plate Tectonics. Hardcover ed. Oxford Univ. Press, 1995.
 Roughgarden, J, May, R. M., and Levin, S. A. (eds.). Perspectives in Ecological Theory. Oxford Univ. Press, 1995.
 
 Roughgarden, J. Theory of Population Genetics and Evolutionary Ecology: an Introduction. 1st ed. Prentice Hall, 1979.
Simpson, Layne A. Gender and Society, vol. 19, no. 3, 2005, pp. 425–426. JSTOR, www.jstor.org/stable/30044605.

References

External links 
 Joan Roughgarden profile – Stanford Univ.
 Joan Roughgarden 50-min interv. – Web Radio (Gender Talk)
 Seed Magazine article on sexual selection theory
 Video (with mp3 available) of conversation with Roughgarden and Robert Wright on Bloggingheads.tv

1946 births
American ecologists
American science writers
American women academics
American women non-fiction writers
Evolutionary biologists
Extended evolutionary synthesis
Harvard University alumni
LGBT Christians
LGBT people from New Jersey
American LGBT scientists
Living people
Mathematical ecologists
Sexual orientation and science
Stanford University Department of Biology faculty
Stonewall Book Award winners
Theistic evolutionists
Theoretical biologists
Transgender academics
Transgender scientists
Transgender studies academics
Transgender women
University of Massachusetts Boston faculty
University of Rochester alumni
Women ecologists
Women evolutionary biologists
Women science writers
Writers from Paterson, New Jersey
American transgender writers